Maurice Levy may refer to:
Maurice Lévy (1838–1910), French engineer
Maurice Lévy (1922–2022), French physicist
Sir Maurice Levy, 1st Baronet (1859–1933), British Member of Parliament for Loughborough
Maurice Lévy (Publicis) (born 1942), French advertising magnate
Maurice Levy (The Wire), TV character on HBO's The Wire

See also
Morris Levy (1927–1990), American music executive